Chagny is the name of the following communes in France:

 Chagny, Ardennes, in the Ardennes department
 Chagny, Saône-et-Loire, in the Saône-et-Loire department